5th Nova Scotia general election may refer to:

Nova Scotia general election, 1770, the 5th general election to take place in the Colony of Nova Scotia, for the 5th General Assembly of Nova Scotia, or
1882 Nova Scotia general election, the 27th overall general election for Nova Scotia, for the (due to a counting error in 1859) 28th Legislative Assembly of Nova Scotia, but considered the 5th general election for the Canadian province of Nova Scotia.